Yesterday's Love Songs/Today's Blues is a 1963 studio album by Nancy Wilson, arranged by Gerald Wilson. It was her highest charting album, entering the Billboard Top 200 on January 25, 1964, and ultimately reaching No. 4. It remained on the chart for 42 weeks. The 1991 CD edition featured a different cover image and added five bonus tracks drawn from other sessions with Gerald Wilson (two from the album How Glad I Am, and three from singles).

Track listing
 "The Song Is You" (Oscar Hammerstein II, Jerome Kern) – 1:58
 "The Very Thought of You" (Ray Noble) – 2:51
 "Satin Doll" (Duke Ellington, Johnny Mercer, Billy Strayhorn) – 2:21
 "Bewitched, Bothered and Bewildered" (Lorenz Hart, Richard Rodgers) – 3:02
 "Sufferin' with the Blues" (Teddy "Cherokee" Conyers, Lloyd Pemberton) – 2:10
 "Someone to Watch over Me" (George Gershwin, Ira Gershwin) – 2:31
 "The Best Is Yet to Come" (Cy Coleman, Carolyn Leigh) – 2:18
 "Never Let Me Go" (Ray Evans, Jay Livingston) – 2:29
 "Send Me Yesterday" (J.H. Smith) – 2:12
 "All My Tomorrows" (Sammy Cahn, Jimmy Van Heusen) – 2:40
 "Please Send Me Someone to Love" (Percy Mayfield) – 2:33
 "Blue Prelude" (Joe Bishop, Gordon Jenkins) – 2:53
 Bonus tracks not included on the original 1963 release:
 "What Are You Doing New Year's Eve?" (Frank Loesser) – 2:23
 "Show Goes On" (Bernard Roth) – 2:48 (from How Glad I Am)
 "West Coast Blues" (Wes Montgomery) – 2:01 (from How Glad I Am)
 "Tell Me the Truth" (H. Jackson, D. D. Jackson) – 2:34
 "My Sweet Thing" – 2:21

Personnel

Performance
Nancy Wilson – vocals
Teddy Edwards – tenor saxophone
Harold Land – tenor saxophone
Paul Horn – alto saxophone
Joe Maini – alto saxophone
Don Raffell – baritone saxophone
Al Porcino – trumpet
Carmell Jones – trumpet
John Ewing – trombone
Wild Bill Davis – organ
Jack Wilson – piano
Joe Pass – guitar
Jimmy Bond – double bass
Kenny Dennis – drums
Gerald Wilson – arranger, conductor

References

1964 albums
Nancy Wilson (jazz singer) albums
Albums arranged by Gerald Wilson
Capitol Records albums
Albums conducted by Gerald Wilson